Looking for Jake is a collection of science fiction, horror and fantasy stories by British author China Miéville. It was first published by Del Rey Books and Macmillan in 2005.

Stories

The book contains eleven short stories, a novella ("The Tain"), a novelette ("Reports of Certain Events in London"), and a comic book-esque tale ("On The Way to the Front"), which was illustrated by British comic book artist Liam Sharp. Eleven of the stories were originally published between 1998 and 2004, and the remaining four ("The Ball Room", "Go Between", "Jack", "On the Way to the Front") had never been published before. The short story, "The Ball Room" was co-written by Miéville, Emma Bircham and Max Schaefer, and the novella, "The Tain" was published as a free standing book in 2002.

All of the stories are set in London, with the exceptions of "Jack", set in Miéville's created world Bas-Lag, and "Foundation", the setting of which is not specified. The stories are as follows:

Adaptations
In 2006 it was announced that the story Details was turned into a script by Dan Kay, and subsequently picked up by studio Paramount Vantage. The script was said to expand upon the original story's exploration of pareidolia and rework the plot to feature a father and daughter. As of November 2008, Martyrs director Pascal Laugier is attached to direct.

Further reading

References

External links
 Looking for Jake at Locus online
 Review of Looking for Jake at SFFWorld.com
 Review of Looking for Jake from the Readercon 17 Souvenir Book.

2005 short story collections
British short story collections
Speculative fiction short story collections
Works by China Miéville
Del Rey books
Macmillan Publishers books